Western Rural was a weekly journal published in Chicago, Illinois and Detroit, Michigan. It existed between 1862 and 1901.

History and profile
Western Rural was founded in 1862. It published information relating to agriculture, horticulture, and livestock as well as rural news and domestic affairs. It was intended for "western farms, western homes, and western affairs in general" as proclaimed by its masthead. The edition published in Chicago was intended for the western United States, while the Detroit edition was for Michigan and Canada. The magazine ceased publication in 1901.

References 

Agricultural magazines
Weekly magazines published in the United States
Defunct magazines published in the United States
Horticultural magazines
Magazines established in 1862
Magazines disestablished in 1901
Magazines published in Chicago
Magazines published in Detroit